Project 6, or simply P6, is a global surveillance project jointly operated by  U.S. Central Intelligence Agency (CIA) in close cooperation with the German intelligence agencies Bundesnachrichtendienst (BND) and Bundesamt für Verfassungsschutz (BfV). As part of efforts to combat terrorism, the project includes a massive database containing personal information such as photos, license plate numbers, Internet search histories and telephone metadata of presumed jihadists. The headquarters of the project is located in Neuss, Germany.

See also 
 List of government surveillance projects
 Nachrichtendienstliches Informationssystem

References 

Databases
Federal Intelligence Service